Klaus an der Pyhrnbahn is a municipality in the district of Kirchdorf an der Krems in the Austrian state of Upper Austria.

Geography
Klaus lies in the Traunviertel. About 81 percent of the municipality is forest, and 7 percent is farmland.

References

Cities and towns in Kirchdorf an der Krems District